Several municipalities in the Canadian province of Quebec held mayoral and council elections on November 6, 1994. The most closely watched contest was in Montreal, where Pierre Bourque was elected to his first term as mayor.

Results

Montreal

Montréal-Nord

Cowansville

Magog

Results from outside of Montreal are taken from Claude Arpin, "MUNICIPAL ELECTIONS Eastern Townships," Montreal Gazette, 7 November 1994, A5.

References

 
1994